First Avenue School is a historic school building at Glen Burnie, Anne Arundel County, Maryland.  It is a large classically inspired building prominently situated on a mostly residential street, one block west of Glen Burnie's central business district. It was built and probably designed by Edward Woodfall, a noted local architect and builder. The school has two sections; one built in 1899 and a second in 1917. The first section is a brick, one-story, two-room, hip-roofed building now serves as a rear wing to the 1917 addition. The large two-story brick gable-roofed Classical Revival-style addition more than quadrupled the school's size.  After closure as a school, the building was used as a beauty school and church, and is being converted to condominiums.

It was listed on the National Register of Historic Places in 2007.

References

External links
, at Maryland Historical Trust

School buildings on the National Register of Historic Places in Maryland
Buildings and structures in Anne Arundel County, Maryland
National Register of Historic Places in Anne Arundel County, Maryland